Grabovača is a cave park located in Perušić, Croatia.

It is the elevation of the mid-Velebit, which is situated between the Lika karst plains and fields in Perusic, 2 km from the center of Perušić. It is located at 770 m above sea level near the karst basin of the river Lika. With it on the west and south shoots wide panorama of the vast karst plateau with Lika River canyon, an artificial lake breads and green wall on the far horizon of Velebit.

On the east side, historical monuments tower from the late 17th-century parish church, from the late 17th the century. On Grabovaca there is many underground karst forms, which make up a quarter of the total number of protected cave facilities in Croatia. The complex variety and abundance of calcite formations valuable speleological phenomena (six cave and a cave) is located at spatially restricted sites of only . The park features eight caves and a pit, all which feature calcite formations.

The park is protected and managed locally. The caves are available to be seen in all the seasons except winter.

The Grabovača cave is planning to connect to the existing lighting electricity as a source of power even in the current year, and the obtaining of financial assets and replace with a new lighting system that would be adapted to environmental standards in a way that the minimum extent color temperature lighting effect the existing microclimate of the cave.

References

Further reading
 

Protected areas of Lika-Senj County
Parks in Croatia
Caves of Croatia
Show caves